Hochwand (2,719 m) is a mountain in the Mieming Range in Tyrol, Austria. 

It is most famous for its impressive north face, which tumbles for 1,300 m down into the Gaistal valley below. The normal route to the summit is from the south, where the slopes are less steep. It is a very difficult climb from all sides and much scrambling is required to reach the summit. Climbs usually begin at the village of Wildermieming.

References

Mountains of the Alps
Mountains of Tyrol (state)
Two-thousanders of Austria